A very-long-chain fatty acid (VLCFA) is a fatty acid with 22 or more carbons.  Their biosynthesis occurs in the endoplasmic reticulum.  VLCFA's can represent up to a few percent of the total fatty acid content of a cell.

Unlike most fatty acids, VLCFAs are too long to be metabolized in the mitochondria, in the endoplasmic reticulum (ER) in plants and must be metabolized in peroxisomes.

Certain peroxisomal disorders, such as adrenoleukodystrophy and Zellweger syndrome, can be associated with an accumulation of VLCFAs.
Enzymes that produce VLCFAs are the targets of herbicides including pyroxasulfone.

Major VLCFAs
Some of the more common saturated VLCFAs: lignoceric acid (C24), cerotic acid (C26), montanic acid (C28), melissic acid  (C30), lacceroic acid (C32), ghedoic acid (C34), and the odd-chain fatty acid ceroplastic acid (C35).  Several monounsaturated VLCFAs are also known: nervonic acid (Δ15-24:1), ximenic acid (Δ17-26:1), and lumequeic acid (Δ21-30:1).

See also
 ACADVL
 SLC27A2
 SLC27A5
 Cerotic acid, the fatty acid associated with adrenoleukodystrophy

References

Bibliography

Fatty acids